Phora Durbar was a palace built by Bir Shumsher Jang Bahadur Rana in 1895 in Kathmandu, Nepal. Located right in front of Narayanhiti Palace and spread over 8 acres, the palace was sold to the United States in 1966 after which it was demolished promptly to build a country club exclusively for American embassy staff and American citizens.  Phora Durbar is also called the "American Club" or even "Little America".

References 

Palaces in Kathmandu
Historic buildings and structures